Le Pustra (born 1 July 1977) is an actor, singer, salonnier and kunstfigur who has performed in European cabaret and variety since 2006 but is best known as the creative director of the Weimar Cabaret inspired theatre play Le Pustra's Kabarett der Namenlosen. Le Pustra incorporates elements of Theatre, Drag and Fashion in his work and is often seen in macabre white face make-up, resembling a Weimar porcelain doll or Pierrot.

Early life
Le Pustra was born in South Africa and relocated to the United Kingdom in 2000 to pursue a career in musical theatre in London. Le Pustra emerged onto the London underground cabaret and variety scene in 2006.

Le Pustra's Kabarett Der Namenlosen
In 2011, Le Pustra created a contemporary reimagining of the Berliner Kabarett during the Weimar Culture interwar years in Berlin. The show was entitled Le Pustra's Kabarett der Namenlosen or Cabaret of the Nameless and was first performed on the 24th of September 2011 at the Old Chomeley Boys Club in London.

In 2016 the project was developed in Berlin and co-produced by Bohème Sauvage. The show featured an international cast and selected music from Friedrich Hollaender, Mischa Spoliansky, Willy Rosen and Kurt Weill. Le Pustra's character was partly inspired by actor Joel Grey, dancer Anita Berber and Marlene Dietrich. The original show, also entitled Kabarett der Namenlosen was a notorious but popular cabaret in Weimar-era Berlin from 1926 till 1932 and created by Erich Lowinsky-  also known as "Elow". 

In October 2017, Le Pustra and the cast of Kabarett der Namenlosen performed "Das lila Lied" for the BBC Four series Tunes for Tyrants: Music and Power with Suzy Klein. Between 2016 and 2019 American Artist, Ella Guru created three large oil paintings inspired by the show. In 2018, Irish artist Alana Richards created a series of paintings and an art exhibition based on the show's characters entitled: Morphium: Hallucinations of a Kabarett. The last performance of Kabarett der Namenlosen took place on 8 March 2020 in Berlin. 

In 2022 Kabarett der Namenlosen was featured in Babylon Berlin Season 4 with Le Pustra reprising his role as Edwina Morell. The scene depicts a new interpretation of Erich Lowinsky's notorious version, originally performed at the Monbijou Cabaret in Berlin on Monday nights.

A revival of Kabarett der Namenlosen is planned for December 2023 at Heimathafen Neukölln in Berlin.

Babylon Berlin
In 2020, Le Pustra made his television debut as Edwina Morell, the mysterious owner of the Luxor nightclub in the award-winning German crime drama Babylon Berlin season 3. The character of Edwina was inspired by Le Pustra's Kabarett der Namenlosen theatre show. Le Pustra returns as Morell in season 4 and appears as the diabolical host of the Kabarett der Namenlosen, staged at the Moka Efti nightclub.

Film and Television appearances
In 2014, Le Pustra appeared in Director Shelly Love's incomplete fantasy film The Fallen Circus playing a latex-clad villain and can also be heard on the film's score as a guest musical saw player. Le Pustra's costume was designed by Oliver Garcia who have worked on films such as Maleficent and Hugo.
In October 2017, Le Pustra and the cast of Kabarett der Namenlosen performed "Das lila Lied" for the BBC Four series Tunes for Tyrants: Music and Power with Suzy Klein. 
In 2018, Le Pustra appeared on Anthony Bourdain's Parts Unknown Season 11 (Episode 6) which aired on CNN.

Music videos
Le Pustra performed as two characters in the music video for Black for the Occasion by Faroese artist, Heiðrik á Heygum. The video was filmed in Reykjavík, Iceland in  2018. 
He also appeared in the 2007 music video "Starz in their Eyes" by British recording artist Just Jack.

Theatre, Variety and Cabaret
In early 2011, Le Pustra co-produced and wrote a Vaudevillian all-male show entitled 'Villains' which was produced in Rome's Teatro Palladium. RuPaul’s Drag Race UK contestant Joe Black (drag queen) co-starred in the show. The show returned to Rome for one night only on 5 September 2011 at the Villa Celimontana Festival.

On 23 October 2012, Le Pustra was invited by Amanda Palmer to join a live musical saw performance (dubbed a Saw-chestra) and accompanying Neil Gaiman's live rendition of Leon Payne's song "Psycho". The Saw-chestra members included Le Pustra, Victor Victoria from musical duo, EastEnd Cabaret and Adrian Stout from cult Cabaret group, The Tiger Lillies.

Other Cabaret appearances include The Royal Academy of Arts, Skibo Castle, Wilton's Music Hall, The Box (London), Venice Carnival, Life Ball (Vienna), Södra Teatern (Stockholm), Edinburgh Fringe Festival, Wintergarten Varieté (Berlin), Madame JoJo's (London), Palais de Tokyo (Paris), Schirn Kunsthalle (Frankfurt), Coney Island (New York) and Perth World Fringe Festival,

Club nights include The Face by Steve Strange, Torture Garden, Act ART and Club Room Service by drag queen DJ and party promoter Jodie Harsh.

Fashion, Books and Art
In 2010, Le Pustra produced and directed a fashion video for Serbian designer Marko Mitanovski which were screened at London Fashion Week, London's Selfridges and Malaysian International Fashion Week. The short fashion film, Mr Pustra’s Lament Act II was selected to screen at Diane Pernet's Film Festival, 'A Shaded View on Fashion Film' in Milan, Italy in June 2012. That same year Le Pustra walked in London Fashion Week for designer Ziad Ghanem and was invited back the following year. Le Pustra also modelled for fashion designer Ivana Pilja in 2013 and they collaborated once again for Berlin Alternative Fashion Week in September 2015 and March 2016. Other credits include a fashion campaign for Air Berlin, a cameo in the fashion film: 'The Dionysian' directed by Stephen Lally,

Le Pustra's image have been published in British and Italian Vogue, Hunger Magazine, Reuters, French Playboy, I-D, Dark Beauty Magazine, Spindle Magazine and various published books on nightlife and clubbing culture including New Club Kids: London Party Fashion in the Noughties by photographer, Oggy Yordanov, 'What Else Is in the Teaches of Peaches by Peaches (musician) 'Night Flowers' by Damien Frost 'Boy Story' by Magnus Arrevad, 'In der Fremde: Pictures from Home' by Romeo Alaeff and 'The Fantastic World of Atelieri O. Haapala'.

In 2020, Le Pustra co-authored a chapter with Dr. Anna-Sophie Jürgens for the book Circus and the Avant-Gardes: History, Imaginary, Innovation published by Routledge. The chapter, entitled Glam Clowning: From Dada to Gaga – A Conversation with Le Pustra explores the origin and reinterpretation of the Dada inspired vinyl suit made famous by German countertenor and New Wave artist, Klaus Nomi.

Lectures
Le Pustra participated as a guest speaker for various Educational Institutions including UCLA, Goethe-Institut, CIEE in Berlin, Humboldt University of Berlin, The Australian National University, Freie Universität Berlin and Morbid Anatomy.

References

External links
 IMDb
 Official Website
 Le Pustra at London Fashion Week
 Le Pustra talks to Suzy Klein
 Hallo Deutschland, ZDF

LGBT cabaret performers
Dark cabaret musicians
South African gay actors
Gay musicians
1977 births
Living people
British LGBT singers
Kabarettists
20th-century LGBT people
21st-century LGBT people